Saranchit Charoensuk (born July 20, 1987) is a member of the Thailand men's national volleyball team.

Clubs
  Suan Dusit (2012–2013)
  Sisaket–Suan Dusit (2013–2014)
  Chonburi E-Tech Air Force (2014–2015)
  Air Force  (2016–2017)
  Nakhon Ratchasima  (2017–present)

Awards

Individuals
 2008 AVC Cup "Best Setter"
 2017–18 Thailand League "Best Setter"
 2018–19 Thailand League "Best Setter"

Clubs
 2012–13 Thailand League -  Runner-up, with Suandusit 
 2014–15 Thailand League -  Runner-up, with Chonburi E-Tech Air Force
 2015 Thai–Denmark Super League -  Champion, with Chonburi E-Tech Air Force
 2016–17 Thailand League -  Champion, with Air Force
 2017 Thai–Denmark Super League -  Runner-up, with Air Force
 2017–18 Thailand League -  Champion, with Nakhon Ratchasima
 2018 Thai–Denmark Super League -  Third, with Nakhon Ratchasima
 2019 Thai–Denmark Super League -  Champion, with Nakhon Ratchasima

References

1987 births
Living people
Saranchit Charoensuk
Saranchit Charoensuk
Volleyball players at the 2010 Asian Games
Volleyball players at the 2014 Asian Games
Volleyball players at the 2018 Asian Games
Saranchit Charoensuk
Saranchit Charoensuk
Southeast Asian Games medalists in volleyball
Competitors at the 2009 Southeast Asian Games
Competitors at the 2011 Southeast Asian Games
Competitors at the 2013 Southeast Asian Games
Competitors at the 2015 Southeast Asian Games
Competitors at the 2017 Southeast Asian Games
Saranchit Charoensuk
Competitors at the 2019 Southeast Asian Games
Saranchit Charoensuk
Setters (volleyball)
Saranchit Charoensuk
Saranchit Charoensuk